Edward Fletcher may refer to:

Edward Fletcher (engineer) (1807–1889), British engineer and locomotive superintendent
Edward Taylor Fletcher (1817–1897), Canadian land surveyor and writer
Edward Fletcher (politician) (1911–1983), British Labour Party politician
Duke Bootee (Edward G. Fletcher), rapper and hip hop and rap producer
Ed Fletcher (1872–1955), American politician
Ted Fletcher (1925–2000), Australian rules footballer